Blairsville Middle-High School is one of two secondary schools in the Blairsville-Saltsburg School District. The campus is shared with the school's sole feeder school, Blairsville Elementary School and the District office at the intersection of US Routes 119 and 22 in Burrell Township. The campus is 36-acres in size and is in close proximity to Higher-level institutions in the area.

About the School
Blairsville has a very diverse selection of core academic classes range from general to advanced placement and include college in the classroom and dual enrollment opportunities. A total of six Advanced Placement courses are offered: AP Chemistry, AP World History, AP United States History, AP Calculus AB, AP Physics C: Mechanics, and AP English Literature. Typically, approximately eighty percent of graduates  complete courses that prepare them for entry to a university or technical school. Eight percent graduate with credits from the Indiana County Technology Center, which prepare them for immediate employment(out of the county), continuing education at Westmoreland County Community College or military service. Blairsville High School
Blairsville Middle-High School is a technologically advanced school with three computer labs, a portable wireless lab, a computer assisted drafting and design lab, a computer assisted mathematics lab, and a local area network with independent servers and Internet access on all computers.Blairsville Middle School

Alma Mater
The Alma Mater for Blairsville High School:
Hail, Blairsville High, Glorious Alma Mater.
You who guide the steps of youth
With your torch of faith and freedom.
Blairsville High to thee we sing.
Accept the heartfelt praise we sing.
Hail, Blairsville High, Glorious Alma Mater.
Loyal friends we met through you.
Loving memories linger ever.
Blairsville High to thee we sing.
Accept the thankful praise we sing

Graduation Requirements
In order to graduate from BMHS, a student must obtain 23.2 Credits of coursework as well as complete a graduation project.

Coursework Breakdown
Coursework is as follows

Vocational Education
Students in grades 10-12 have the opportunity to attend the Indiana County Technology Center in White Township for part of their school day if they wish to obtain training in a specific area that the ICTC offers.

Athletics
Blairsville is in PIAA District VI:
 Baseball - Class AA
 Basketball - Class AA
 Cross Country - Class AA
 Football - Class A
 Golf - Class AAAA
 Softball - Class AA
 Track and Field - Class AA
 Volleyball - Class AA
 Wrestling - Class AA

Grades 7-8 Sports
These are non-conference sports and include:
 Basketball
 Football
 Volleyball
 Wrestling

References

Public high schools in Pennsylvania
Schools in Indiana County, Pennsylvania
Public middle schools in Pennsylvania